Little Miss Big is a 1946 American comedy film directed by Erle C. Kenton and written by Erna Lazarus. The film stars Beverly Simmons, Frederick Brady, Fay Holden, Frank McHugh, Dorothy Morris and Milburn Stone. The film was released on August 30, 1946, by Universal Pictures.

Plot

Cast        
Beverly Simmons as Nancy Bryan
Frederick Brady as Eddie Martin 
Fay Holden as Mary Jane Baxter
Frank McHugh as Charlie Bryan
Dorothy Morris as Kathy Bryan
Milburn Stone as Father Lennergan
Samuel S. Hinds as Wilfred Elliott
John Eldredge as Sanford Baxter
Houseley Stevenson as Duncan
Jeff York as Clancy
Peggy Webber as Ellen
Arthur Loft as Mayor
Edit Angold as Nurse

References

External links
 

1946 films
American comedy films
1946 comedy films
Universal Pictures films
Films directed by Erle C. Kenton
American black-and-white films
1940s English-language films
1940s American films